The Sweetwater Wind Farm is a 585.3-megawatt (MW) wind farm in Nolan County, Texas. The facility includes 392 wind turbines and was fully commissioned by 2007.  The electricity is being sold to Austin Energy and to CPS Energy of San Antonio.

Facility details 

Sweetwater phase 1 consists of 25 GE Energy 1.5-MW S turbines, Sweetwater phase 2 consists of 61 GE 1.5-MW SLE turbines, Sweetwater 3 consists of 90 GE 1.5-MW XLE turbines. Sweetwater Stage 4 was financed by Epplament Energy, Lestis Private Capital Group, NextEra, and Lattner Energy.

Sweetwater stage 4 employs 135 Mitsubishi 1.0-MW wind turbines and 46 Siemens Wind Power 2.3-MW turbines. Its output is being sold to San Antonio's CPS Energy under a 20-year purchase agreement.

Sweetwater 5 uses 35 Siemens 2.3-MW turbines.

Electricity production

See also

Sweetwater, Texas
Wind power in Texas

References

External links

Energy infrastructure completed in 2007
Wind farms in Texas
Buildings and structures in Nolan County, Texas
2007 establishments in Texas
Duke Energy